is the 15th single from Japanese idol group Idoling!!!. It reached number 4 on Oricon chart. "Yarakai Heart" used as LittleBigPlanet 2 Japanese release CM song. The coupling song "Queen Bee ~Shōjo no Jidai Kara~" used as Fuji TV Kiseki Taiken! Unbelievable ending theme song for January - March 2011 and "Konayuki ga Mau Machinami de" used as CBC Otakara Hasshin Tower DAI-NAMO ending theme song.

Contents 
Yarakai Heart released in three types:
 Limited A-type (CD and DVD)
 Limited B-type (CD and original QT Card)
 Normal Type (CD only)

Track listing

CD

DVD 
 Yarakai Heart music video
 Making of Yarakai Heart music video and CD jacket photoshoot

Notes 
 "Queen Bee~Shōjo no Jidai Kara~" sung by six members with body height over 160 cm. They are #3 Mai Endō, #9 Rurika Yokoyama, #15 Nao Asahi, #16 Ami Kikuchi, #19 Yurika Tachibana, and #20 Ai Ōkawa. The song is supervised by Han Jae Ho and Kim Seung Soo (Sweetune), known for their works with Korean pop group "KARA". Some parts of the lyric are written in Korean.
 "Ichi-koi" only available on normal edition. It sung by Nao Asahi and Kaoru Gotō (Team学ラン, Team Gakuran) as the winner of Idoling!!! & Yahoo! Japan special collaboration event voted by fans.

References

External links 
 Idoling!!! official site - Fuji TV
 Idoling!!! official site - Pony Canyon
 Kiseki Taiken! Unbelievable official site - Fuji TV
 Otakara Hasshin DAI-NAMO official site - CBC

2011 singles
Idoling!!! songs
2011 songs
Pony Canyon singles